Walter Shindi Ihoshi (born 17 July 1961) is a Brazilian politician. He has spent his political career representing São Paulo, having served as federal deputy representative from 2015 to 2019.

Personal life
Corrêa us the son of Migaku Iihoshi and Yoshiko Iihoshi. After graduating with a B.A. in economics, Ihoshi completed his master's degree from 1987 to 1988 at the University of California.

Political career
Ihoshi voted in favor of the impeachment against then-president Dilma Rousseff and political reformation. He would later vote in against opening a corruption investigation against Rousseff's successor Michel Temer, and voted in favor of the 2017 Brazilian labor reforms.

In 2018 Ihoshi and several other politicians who were not re-elected that years election were offered civil service positions by Onyx Lorenzoni for the cabinet for president elect Jair Bolsonaro. Ihoshi had previously been offered a similar position the year before by Bolsonaro's predecessor Michel Temer, although he turned the offer down due to his duties as federal deputy.

References

1961 births
Living people
People from São Paulo
University of California alumni
Brazilian politicians of Japanese descent
Democrats (Brazil) politicians
Social Democratic Party (Brazil, 2011) politicians
Members of the Chamber of Deputies (Brazil) from São Paulo
Members of the Legislative Assembly of São Paulo